John Candito (born June 11, 1982) is an American semi-retired professional wrestler, and is the younger brother of late professional wrestler Chris Candido. He is best known under the ring name Johnny Candido.

Professional wrestling career 
Candido trained under his brother and debuted in 2000. He did not reach a prominent position on the independent circuit until the death of his brother in April 2005, at which point he competed in several tribute matches. Candido later wrestled in a World Wrestling Entertainment dark match against Balls Mahoney and Axl Rotten.

He appeared at Unbreakable on September 11, 2005, to watch the four-way elimination match for the NWA World Tag Team Championship. The winners of the Chris Candido Memorial Tag Team Tournament, Alex Shelley and Sean Waltman, were scheduled to face incumbent champions The Naturals, Team Canada, and America's Most Wanted. When Waltman no-showed the event, Candido left the audience, climbed onto the ring apron and assumed the role of Shelley's tag team partner. Candido and Shelley were eliminated soon after when Candido was pinned.

On September 17, 2005, Candido won a tournament to win the NWA Midwest Heavyweight Championship, which had been vacated upon his brother's Chris' death. He later vacated the championship in January 2007.

Candido is currently working with the independent promotion National Wrestling Superstars. He also wrestles for the independent federations Pro Wrestling Unplugged and USA Xtreme Wrestling.

Championships and accomplishments
NWA Midwest
NWA Midwest Heavyweight Championship (1 time)
National Wrestling Superstars
NWS Hardcore Championship (2 times)

References

External links 
 
 

1982 births
American male professional wrestlers
Living people
Professional wrestlers from New Jersey
Professional wrestling managers and valets
21st-century professional wrestlers